The Fort Smith Twins (also known as the Fort Smith Giants) were a minor league baseball team in Fort Smith, Arkansas that existed in various incarnations from 1887 through 1953, playing a total of 36 seasons. From 1911 onward, the teams played in the Western Association.

Beginning in 1921, the teams played most of their home games at Andrews Field in downtown Fort Smith on land now owned by the Fort Smith National Cemetery.

Baseball Hall of Fame inductee Chick Hafey played for Fort Smith in 1923. Hugo Bezdek managed the Fort Smith Soldiers for part of the 1909 season.

Notable Fort Smith alumni

Hall of Fame Alumni

 Chick Hafey (1923) Inducted, 1971

Notable alumni

 Mickey Doolin (1923)
 Harry Feldman (1938)
 Jake Flowers (1924)
 Ival Goodman (1931) 2 x MLB All-Star
 Luke Hamlin (1929)
 Ducky Holmes (1922)
 Buddy Kerr (1941) MLB All-Star
 Pepper Martin (1925) 4 x MLB All-Star
 Gus Mancuso (1926) 2 x MLB All-Star
 Heinie Mueller (1920)
 Flint Rhem (1924)
 Earl Smith (1916)
 Al Todd (1929)
 Gee Walker (1928) MLB All-Star
 Jo-Jo White (1929-1930)

References

Baseball Reference

Baseball teams established in 1887
Baseball teams disestablished in 1953
Defunct Western Association teams
Defunct Arkansas State League teams
Defunct Oklahoma-Arkansas-Kansas League teams
Defunct South Central League teams
Defunct Missouri Valley League teams
Defunct Southwestern League teams
Cleveland Guardians minor league affiliates
New York Giants minor league affiliates
Detroit Tigers minor league affiliates
St. Louis Browns minor league affiliates
St. Louis Cardinals minor league affiliates
Professional baseball teams in Arkansas
1887 establishments in Arkansas
1953 disestablishments in Arkansas
Fort Smith, Arkansas
Defunct baseball teams in Arkansas